Paweł Stanisław Stok (22 March 1913 in Tarnopol – 18 August 1993 in Kraków) was a Polish basketball player who competed in the 1936 Summer Olympics.

He was part of the Polish basketball team that finished fourth in the Olympic tournament. He played three matches for the national team.

References

External links
 Profile

1913 births
1993 deaths
Sportspeople from Ternopil
Polish men's basketball players
Olympic basketball players of Poland
Basketball players at the 1936 Summer Olympics
Polish Austro-Hungarians
People from the Kingdom of Galicia and Lodomeria